"When the Snow Falls" is the first single from the Dutch group Ten Sharp, released in January 1985. The song was written by the band and produced by Michiel Hoogenboezem. The single made it into the Vara's Verrukkelijke 15 charts and entered the Dutch Top 40 Tip-charts at the end of January 1985. The extended version of the song adds an atmospheric intro to the song. Halfway the song there are guitar solos and synth-arpeggios laid on the instrumental basic tracks. The intro is also featured on the version on the album Under the Water-Line.

The B-side "Time and Time" is a heavy dance-track. The song was actually recorded in a demo recording-session, but was remixed for the single.

Track listings 
 7" single
 "When the Snow Falls" - 4:20
 "Time and Time" - 3:55

 12" maxi
 "When the Snow Falls" (Extended Version) - 8:15
 "Time and Time" - 3:55

Credits 
 Produced by Michiel Hoogenboezem
 Engineered by Ronald Prent
 Artwork: Theo Stapel

Musicians 
 Vocals: Marcel Kapteijn
 Keyboards: Niels Hermes
 Guitars: Martin Boers
 Bass: Ton Groen
 Drums: Wil Bouwes

1991 version 
"When the Snow Falls" was released again in late 1991. This version was slightly edited down from 4:20 to 4:05.

Track listings 
 7" single
 "When the Snow Falls" - 4:05
 "Some Sails" - 4:15

 CD-single maxi
 "When the Snow Falls" - 4:05
 "Some Sails" - 4:15
 "All in Love Is Fair" (Stevie Wonder cover) - 3:57
 "Closing Hour" - 3:58

Credits 
 Produced by Michiel Hoogenboezem and Niels Hermes
 Photography: Rob Verhorst

References 

 "When The Snow Falls" on Discogs.com 
http://www.discogs.com/Ten-Sharp-When-The-Snow-Falls/master/102733
http://www.popinstituut.nl/encyclopedie/discografie/ten-sharp.4446.html
http://www.dutchcharts.nl/showitem.asp?interpret=Ten+Sharp&titel=When+The+Snow+Falls&cat=s

External links 
 The official Ten Sharp website

1985 debut singles
Ten Sharp songs
1985 songs
Epic Records singles